Verkhnyaya Maza is a rural locality (a settlement) and the administrative center of Verkhnemazovskoye Rural Settlement, Verkhnekhavsky District, Voronezh Oblast, Russia. The population was 448 as of 2010. There are 6 streets.

Geography 
Verkhnyaya Maza is located 24 km east of Verkhnyaya Khava (the district's administrative centre) by road. Fominichi is the nearest rural locality.

References 

Rural localities in Verkhnekhavsky District